Southeastern Community College is a public community college in Iowa with two campuses, one in Burlington and one in Keokuk.

History 
Southeastern Community College was formed in 1967 with the merging of two local colleges: Burlington Junior College, founded in 1920, and Keokuk Community College, founded in 1953.

Campus 
The college also has a regional center in Mount Pleasant and a downtown Burlington site which houses the Center for Business and Industry Services. The West Burlington campus serves as the administrative center and main campus.

Academics 
Southeastern is accredited by the Higher Learning Commission.

Athletics 
The West Burlington campus offers men's basketball, men's baseball, women's softball, golf and women's volleyball. Women's basketball is offered at the Keokuk campus. These teams have enjoyed much success, including three men's basketball championships (2000, 2003, 2004) and one softball national championship (2003). The school mascot is the Blackhawk.

Notable alumni and staff 
 Ivan Almonte, professional basketball player
 Eulis Baez, professional basketball player
 Joe O'Brien, college basketball coach
 Fred Brown, professional basketball player
 Jeff Reichman, member of the Iowa Senate
 Kim Reynolds, 43rd governor of Iowa and 46th lieutenant governor of Iowa
 Filiberto Rivera, professional basketball player
 Devon Rouse, professional racecar driver
 Jimson St. Louis, professional football player
 Doug Thomas, professional basketball player
 Sam Williams, professional basketball player

References

External links 
 

Education in Des Moines County, Iowa
Education in Lee County, Iowa
Community colleges in Iowa
Educational institutions established in 1967
NJCAA athletics
Animation schools in the United States